Sigered was King of Kent, jointly with Eadberht II, in the eighth century.

Sigered is known just from his charters  , one of which is dated 762 and witnessed by Eadberht II.

See also
List of monarchs of Kent

References
 

Kentish monarchs
8th-century English monarchs